Sleepy Hollow may refer to:

Arts, entertainment, and media

Films
The Legend of Sleepy Hollow (film), a 1980 film directed by Henning Schellerup, based on Washington Irving's story 
Sleepy Hollow (film), a 1999 film directed by Tim Burton, based on  Washington Irving's story

Literature
"The Legend of Sleepy Hollow", an 1820 short story by Washington Irving, which inspired numerous adaptations

Music
Sleepy Hallow (born 1999), American rapper and singer
Sleepy Hollow (album), by the Siegel–Schwall Band (1972)
Sleepy Hollow (soundtrack) of the Tim Burton movie (1999)
"Sleepy Hollow", a 2020 song by Trippie Redd from the album Pegasus
"Sleepy Hollow", a 2007 song by the Microphones from The Glow Pt. 2 (Other Songs & Destroyed Versions)

Television
Sleepy Hollow (TV series), a 2013 American television drama series, loosely based on the Washington Irving story

Places

United States
 Sleepy Hollow, Marin County, California
 Sleepy Hollow, San Bernardino County, California
 Sleepy Hollow, Illinois
 Sleepy Hollow, Indiana
 Sleepy Hollow, New York, the setting of Washington Irving's "The Legend of Sleepy Hollow"
 Sleepy Hollow, Virginia
 Sleepy Hollow, Wyoming
 Sleepy Hollow, a section of Plainfield, New Jersey
 Sleepy Hollow Lake, Greene County, New York

Elsewhere
 Sleepy Hollow (Mars), shallow depression on the planet Mars
 Sleepy Hollow, Saskatchewan, Canada
 Sleepy Hollow, South Australia, coastal feature adjoining the mouth of the Murray River

Cemeteries
 Sleepy Hollow Cemetery (Concord, Massachusetts)
 Sleepy Hollow Cemetery, Sleepy Hollow, New York

Other uses
 Sleepy Hollow Country Club, historic country-club in Scarborough-on-Hudson in Briarcliff Manor, New York
 Sleepy Hollow Stakes, thoroughbred-horse race held every fall at Belmont Park, New York
 Sleepy Hollow seat, manufactured by the Heywood-Wakefield Company
 Sleeping sickness of Kalachi, Kazakhstan, sometimes known as sleepy hollow

See also
 Sleepy Hallow, an American rapper